Vignettes is a solo album by pianist Marilyn Crispell recorded in 2007 and released on the ECM label.

Reception

The Allmusic review by Thom Jurek awarded the album 4 stars stating "Vignettes is a remarkable and moving recording -- one that is timeless and honest, and communicates directly, literally, and poetically to the listener in a manner that is gentle yet pronounces its emotional weight without hesitation or self-consciousness".

In a review for Point of Departure, Stuart Broomer called the music "work of stunning economy and an emotional translucence in which keyboard touch reaches rare levels of communication," and wrote: "Crispell's intensity of focus lends this CD a special aura... It's music in which architectural rigor and a slow dance of liberation seem to define a common ground, music in which emotion is free to be both complex and direct."

Writing for All About Jazz, Martin Gladu stated: "Drawing more on the tone-conscious, rubato balladeering of the Bleyian school rather than the cantankerous approach of Cecil Taylor... Crispell blends to her modernist factory a classical music informed eloquence and patina that is all her own. Mixing melodic free-ballads and spatial improvisations with all-over, gestural pieces, she maintains a high level of creativity in her playing throughout the sixty-minute plus session." In a separate All About Jazz article, Budd Kopman remarked: "With Vignettes, Crispell continues to make beautiful music with an intensity that is breathtaking. The seventeen tracks sound of a piece, connected by a searching concentration, regardless of whether the individual piece is a free improvisation or one based on a composition... Vignettes is a new high point for Crispell as she continues her musical journey." AAJ writer John Kelman commented: "Unerringly beautiful, Vignettes may be Crispell's most accessible recording to date. Still, with its innate lack of compromise, it's another compelling addition to a growing discography from the fearlessly open-minded Crispell that reveals new facets with each successive release."

John Fordham, in an article for The Guardian, wrote: "There are hints of Paul Bley's lyrical precision and Jarrett's song motifs in this private, slow-moving, but exquisitely articulated, dreamscape. The melodies often bloom, Bley-like, in short motifs on to which asides fall and accumulate, and though there are a few jagged, more intense pieces... most of the episodes are meditative."

In a review for Elsewhere, Graham Reid remarked: "Crispell stakes a strong claim to being one of the most daring yet considered pianists in improvised music today. Listening music, if you know what I mean."

Track listing
All compositions by Marilyn Crispell except as indicated
 "Vignette I" - 2:19 
 "Valse Triste" - 2:59 
 "Cuida Tu Espíritu" (Jayna Nelson) - 7:47 
 "Gathering Light" - 5:54 
 "Vignettes II" - 2:29 
 "Vignette III" - 1:08 
 "Vignette IV" - 1:48 
 "Vignette V" - 1:36 
 "Sweden" - 7:04 
 "Once" - 3:55 
 "Axis" - 3:45 
 "Vignette VI" - 2:56 
 "Vignette VII" - 4:02 
 "Ballade" - 5:11 
 "Time Past" - 5:41 
 "Stilleweg" (Arve Henriksen) - 6:18 
 "Little Song for My Father" - 3:21

Personnel
 Marilyn Crispell – piano

References

ECM Records albums
Marilyn Crispell albums
2007 albums
Albums produced by Manfred Eicher
Solo piano jazz albums